John Durand may refer to:
 John Durand (MP, died 1788) (c. 1719–1788), English politician
 John Hodsdon Durand (1761–1830), British MP
 John Durand (painter) (fl. 1765–1782), American portraitist

See also
 John Durant (disambiguation)